Chan Hin Kwong (born 27 February 1988 in Hong Kong) is a former Hong Kong professional footballer who played as a left back.

Club career

Tai Po
Chan Hin Kwong joined the newly promoted side Tai Po in 2006. Starting from the 2007–08 season, he got more chances in Tai Po and had become an important player since 2008. However, in the 2008–09 season. he was confirmed to be out for the remainder of the season after he suffered an anterior cruciate ligament injury on 18 November 2008.

On 20 March 2010, he scored the first Hong Kong First Division goal of his football career in the match against Kitchee.

Tuen Mun
In the summer of 2010, Chan Hin Kwong joined newly promoted side Tuen Mun. He helped Tuen Mun to avoid the drop that year.
In the 2011–12 season, he scored his first ever goal for the club in a match against Sun Hei on 24 December 2011. At the end of the season, he confirmed that he will not stay at Tuen Mun.

Citizen
On 8 June 2012, Citizen announced that they have signed Chan. He made his debut for Citizen on 22 September 2012. He played the whole match to help the team defeat Rangers 5–1 in the first leg of first round of the Senior Shield at Sham Shui Po Sports Ground.

Yuen Long FC
He joined Yuen Long in 2014.

Lee Man
On 21 May 2018, Lee Man announced that they had signed Chan.

On 2 June 2020, Chan was named on a list of departures from the club. However, on 3 September 2020, Chan rejoined the club on a short term deal until the end of the 2019–20 season.

Career statistics
 As of 25 September 2012

Honours

Club
Lee Man
 Hong Kong Sapling Cup: 2018–19

References

External links
 
 

Living people
Association football defenders
1988 births
Hong Kong First Division League players
Citizen AA players
Tuen Mun SA players
Tai Po FC players
Yuen Long FC players
Lee Man FC players
Hong Kong Premier League players
Hong Kong footballers